Boysen is a surname. People with the surname include:

Audun Boysen (1929–2000), Norwegian middle-distance runner
Ben Lukas Boysen (born 1981), German musician
Bill Boysen (1936–2020), American artist
Bjørn Boysen (1943–2018), Norwegian organist and educator
David Boysen (born 1991), Danish footballer
George E. Boysen (1890–1967), American politician
Gudrun Boysen (born 1939), Danish physician
Hans-Jürgen Boysen (born 1957), German football player and manager
Harold Koch Boysen (1891–1963), American World War I flying ace
Harro Schulze-Boysen (1909–1942), German resistance fighter against the Nazi regime
Karsten Boysen (born 1938), Venezuelan sailor
Lia Boysen (born 1966), Swedish actress
Libertas Schulze-Boysen (1913–1942), German resistance fighter against the Nazi regime
Markus Boysen (born 1954), German actor
Rasmus Boysen (born 1992), Danish retired handball player
Rudolph Boysen (1895–1950), American horticulturist who created the boysenberry
Sarah Boysen (born 1949), American psychology professor and primate researcher
Søren Boysen (born 1950), Danish canoeist